St Neot may refer to:

Saint Neot, a 9th-century monk from Cornwall
St Neot, Cornwall, a village in Cornwall, England
St Neots, a town in Cambridgeshire, England